Sherlock is the fourth EP of the South Korean boy group Shinee. The EP consists of seven tracks, including the title song "Sherlock (Clue + Note)", a "hybrid remix" of two songs. It was released on March 21, 2012, in South Korea under the label SM Entertainment, and was distributed by KT Music. The EP was made available online worldwide on March 19, 2012. It was Shinee's first Korean release after a year and six months hiatus.

The EP was commercially successful—the title track topped the Gaon Digital Chart, while the EP charted at number one on the Gaon Album Chart. It was the fifth best-selling album of the year in South Korea, with over 180,000 copies sold. It also placed tenth on the Billboard Heatseekers Albums and fifth on the Billboard World Albums charts.

Background and release
Sherlock was Shinee's first Korean release after a year-and-a-half hiatus since the reissue Hello in October 2010 due to their Japanese debut and promotions in 2011. The EP was physically released on March 21, 2012, but was made available online worldwide on March 19 through online music sites such as Melon and iTunes.

The choreography for "Sherlock (Clue + Note)" is characterized by a distinctive style, and is the work of the choreographer Tony Testa.

The music video for the title song was released on March 22. It was directed by Cho Su-hyun and shot in early March at the studios in Namyangju. Shinee can be seen in an 1800s-like museum acting like detectives working on a case. Girls’ Generation's Jessica makes a special appearance in the music video as a mysterious female lead who offers a decisive clue in figuring out the incident. The music video exceeded one million views in a single day.

Composition
The EP consists of seven songs in a variety of styles, including "Stranger", the main theme song of Strangers 6, with a melody composed by Kenzie. The song was first released in Japanese, as a bonus track on their debut Japanese album The First. The lead single "Sherlock (Clue + Note)" is a "hybrid remix", which means it consists of two independent songs ("Clue" and "Note") remixed together to create a new song. The lyrics describe Sherlock's solving of a crime through logical "clues" and intuitive "notes". The title song combines the lyrics from the two songs to create a single storyline.

A Japanese version of "Sherlock (Clue + Note)", written by Natsumi Kobayashi, was included as one of the two tracks on their fourth Japanese CD single "Sherlock", which was released on May 16, 2012, with the Japanese original song "Keeping Love Again" as a B-side. 

"Honesty" was written by member Jonghyun with the help of bandmate Minho, who wrote the rap lyrics, and expresses the group's appreciation towards their fans. "The Reason" features a guitar solo and strings, while "Alarm Clock" was also written by Jonghyun and tells about a man who wants to wake up from the nightmares of a breakup. Minho participated in composing the rap.

Commercial performance and reception

On March 22, 2012, the group started their official promotions and performed the title song for the first on M! Countdown. This was followed by appearances on other South Korean music programs such as Inkigayo and Music Bank.

The EP sold over 135,000 copies at release and ranked number one on the Gaon Album Chart, making it the best-selling release of March 2012. It was the fifth best-selling album of the year in South Korea, with over 180,000 copies sold. It placed at number five on the Billboard World Albums chart and number ten on the Billboard Heatseekers chart. In April, the group won first place for two consecutive weeks on Music Bank and three times on Inkigayo. Shinee performed their final music stage on MBC's Music Core on April 21, 2012.

Hwang Sunup of IZM magazine gave the EP 3.5 out of 5 stars, praising the experimental attempt to create the title track "Sherlock" by mixing up "Clue" and "Note" as well as the lyrics for each song. However, he was disappointed with the remaining songs on the EP, stating these feel more ordinary compared to the impact of the first three tracks.

Accolades

Track listing

Notes
 Minho is credited for writing the rap lyrics.

Charts

Weekly charts

Monthly charts

Year-end charts

Release history

References

External links
 "Sherlock (Clue + Note)" Music Video
 "Sherlock (Clue + Note)" Dance Version

Shinee EPs
SM Entertainment EPs
2012 EPs
Korean-language EPs